The CAF Champions League is a seasonal association football competition established in 1964 as the African Cup of Champions Clubs, open initially to the league champions of all CAF member associations, but since 1997 also currently includes the clubs finishing second in the strongest leagues from the CAF 5-Year Ranking and the competition's defending champions.

List of finals

 The "Year" column refers to the season the competition was held, and wikilinks to the article about that season.
 Finals are listed in the order they were played.

Performances

By club

By nations

Notes & references

Notes

References

External links
CAF Champions League records and history - RSSSF

CAF Champions League
Lists of association football matches
CAF Champions League Finals